The 1996–1997 international cricket season was from September 1996 to April 1997.

Season overview

September

KCA Centenary Tournament 1996-97

October

Australia in India

Zimbabwe in Pakistan

Titan Cup 1996-97

November

Singer Champions Trophy 1996-97

South Africa in India

New Zealand in Pakistan

West Indies in Australia

December

1996–97 Carlton and United Series 1996-97

England in Zimbabwe

India in South Africa

January

Standard Bank International One Day Series 1996-97

England in New Zealand

February

India in Zimbabwe

Australia in South Africa

March

India in the West Indies

Sri Lanka in New Zealand

April

Singer-Akai Cup 1996-97

Pakistan in Sri Lanka

References

1996 in cricket
1997 in cricket